Spathidexia is a genus of parasitic flies in the family Tachinidae.

Species
Spathidexia antillensis Arnaud, 1960
Spathidexia atripalpus Fleming and Wood, 2015
Spathidexia atypica Curran, 1927
Spathidexia aurantiaca Fleming and Wood, 2015
Spathidexia brasiliensis Arnaud, 1960
Spathidexia cerussata Reinhard, 1934
Spathidexia cinereicollis Wulp, 1891
Spathidexia clemonsi Townsend, 1912
Spathidexia creolensis Reinhard, 1955
Spathidexia cylindrica Townsend, 1919
Spathidexia dicta Giglio-Tos, 1893
Spathidexia dunningii (Coquillett, 1895)
Spathidexia elegans (Reinhard, 1964)
Spathidexia flavicornis Brauer & von Bergenstamm, 1891
Spathidexia hernanrodriguezi Fleming and Wood, 2015
Spathidexia juanvialesi Fleming and Wood, 2015
Spathidexia luisrobertogalligosi Fleming and Wood, 2015
Spathidexia luteola Fleming and Wood, 2015
Spathidexia marioburgosi Fleming and Wood, 2015
Spathidexia nexa Reinhard, 1953
Spathidexia niveomarginata Wulp, 1890
Spathidexia pallida Wulp, 1891
Spathidexia reinhardi Arnaud, 1960
Spathidexia setipennis Townsend, 1919
Spathidexia spatulata Townsend, 1928

References

Diptera of South America
Diptera of North America
Dexiinae
Tachinidae genera
Taxa named by Charles Henry Tyler Townsend